Madeira is a city in Hamilton County, Ohio, United States. The population was 9,487 at the 2020 census. Madeira has a Council-Manager form of government, where the elected City Council appoints a paid City Manager to run the day-to-day operations of the city. Madeira is served by its own police department, while fire service is provided by the Madeira-Indian Hill Joint Fire District. Madeira is largely a residential community, with a small downtown and some light industry. Educational needs are served by the Madeira City Schools. Madeira is a suburb of Cincinnati. In 2007, BusinessWeek ranked it as one of the "Best Places to Raise Kids--For Less."

Geography
Madeira is located at  (39.188310, -84.368366).

It is bordered by:
 Indian Hill to the east
 Columbia Township to the south
 Cincinnati (Madisonville) to the south and west
 Silverton to the west
 Sycamore Township to the north

History
Madeira was largely laid out in 1871. Before this time the place was known as a post town, and was named for John Madeira who owned a large tract of land in the vicinity. 

Madeira was incorporated as a village under the statutes of the State of Ohio in 1910. The village was protected by a series of elected marshals and appointed deputy marshals until 1942 when Madeira's first Chief of Police was appointed.

Madeira gained city status in August 1959. The city nearly doubled in area with the 1970 annexation of the South Kenwood area of Columbia Township.

Demographics

2010 census
As of the census of 2010, there were 8,726 people, 3,297 households, and 2,420 families living in the city. The racial makeup of the city was 93.0% White, 2.5% African American, 0.1% Native American, 2.8% Asian, 0.3% from other races, and 1.2% from two or more races. Hispanic or Latino of any race were 2.3% of the population.

There were 3,297 households, of which 36.3% had children under the age of 18 living with them, 62.1% were married couples living together, 8.3% had a female householder with no husband present, 3.0% had a male householder with no wife present, and 26.6% were non-families. 23.7% of all households were made up of individuals, and 10.5% had someone living alone who was 65 years of age or older. The average household size was 2.58 and the average family size was 3.08.

The median age in the city was 42.9 years. 25.6% of residents were under the age of 18; 6% were between the ages of 18 and 24; 21.7% were from 25 to 44; 30.8% were from 45 to 64; and 16% were 65 years of age or older. The gender makeup of the city was 48.1% male and 51.9% female.

2000 census
As of the census of 2000, there were 8,923 people, 3,383 households, and 2,472 families living in the city. The population density was 2,651.0 people per square mile (1,022.3/km2). There were 3,484 housing units at an average density of 1,035.1 per square mile (399.2/km2). The racial makeup of the city was 95.70% White, 1.29% African American, 0.13% Native American, 1.89% Asian, 0.35% from other races, and 0.64% from two or more races. Hispanic or Latino of any race were 0.77% of the population.

There were 3,383 households, out of which 35.8% had children under the age of 18 living with them, 62.9% were married couples living together, 7.7% had a female householder with no husband present, and 26.9% were non-families. 24.7% of all households were made up of individuals, and 12.0% had someone living alone who was 65 years of age or older. The average household size was 2.55 and the average family size was 3.06.

In the city the population was spread out, with 26.7% under the age of 18, 4.3% from 18 to 24, 25.0% from 25 to 44, 24.6% from 45 to 64, and 19.4% who were 65 years of age or older. The median age was 42 years. For every 100 females, there were 89.2 males. For every 100 females age 18 and over, there were 82.8 males.

The median income for a household in the city was $59,626, and the median income for a family was $70,625. Males had a median income of $51,318 versus $38,172 for females. The per capita income for the city was $30,676. About 0.8% of families and 1.3% of the population were below the poverty line, including 0.3% of those under age 18 and 3.3% of those age 65 or over.

Madeira City Schools are ranked at 9th in the state as of 2021.

Notable people
Andrew Benintendi, baseball player
Clarence DeMar, marathoner
Caty McNally, tennis player
John McNally, tennis player

References

External links
 City website
 Madeira City Schools

Cities in Ohio
Cities in Hamilton County, Ohio
1871 establishments in Ohio